Dancing in Water is a 1986 Yugoslavian romantic-drama film directed by Jovan Aćin. In America it frequently shows under the title Hey Babu Riba. The screenplay is by Jovan Aćin, from the memories of Petar Janković, George Zecevic and Mr. Aćin with music by Zoran Simjanović.

Plot
The death of the one-time coxswain of a Serbian rowing crew precipitates their reunion at her funeral. They called her 'Esther' in post-war Yugoslavia a generation ago, but they haven't seen her since her father forbade contact at that time, shortly after they helped her escape Yugoslavia to re-unite with him. Now that she is gone the way is clear for them to be together again and perhaps to see her child, whom they've never met.

Flashbacks return us to those days where they forged enduring friendships against the backdrop of the struggle between Communist and American ideals in Tito's Yugoslavia. The "four" are fascinated by American music and styles, while their rival rowing team is led by a competitor for Esther's affections, a rising member in the Communist elite who bears tattoos of Stalin and Lenin on his wrists.

Each of the four harbored a secret passion for Esther's inspiring beauty. The first modestly allows that he can't tell her what he feels. The next tempts her heart with poetry. Glenn then confesses his love in drunken confidence that he shrugs off as a joke. The last swaggers that it's obvious they are a couple and the rest will understand eventually. But Esther reminds each of them in turn that the five of them are "a four." Despite the shock when she finds herself with child by an outsider, they spirit her across the water to her father's protective embrace. Assuming their complicity in her fall from grace, he peremptorily strikes them from her life.

Inspirations
Evidently part of the story is based on the life of Radomir Perica, who was jailed for flaunting a Mickey Mouse tattoo during the period of the film. The American title Hey Babu Riba has nothing to do with the original title and comes from the brief appearance in the film of a recording of Lionel Hampton's "Hey! Ba-Ba-Re-Bop".

Esther's character is an homage to Esther Williams whose music from Bathing Beauty is a main tune in the movie.

Cast
 Gala Videnović - Esther
 Nebojša Bakočević - Glen 
 Relja Bašić - Glen (older)
 Dragan Bjelogrlić - Sacha
 Marko Todorović - Sacha (older)
 Srđan Todorović - Kica
 Miloš Žutić - Kica (older)
 Goran Radaković - Pop
 Đorđe Nenadović - Pop (older)
 Milan Štrljić - Rile
 Dragomir Bojanić - Rile (older)
 Danica Maksimović - Rada švercerka
 Marko Nikolić - Rile (older - voice)

External links

 - Roger Ebert
 Hey Babu Riba Capsule, Jonathan Rosenbaum, The Chicago Reader

1986 films
Serbo-Croatian-language films
Yugoslav coming-of-age films
1986 romantic drama films
Serbian coming-of-age films
Serbian romantic drama films
Rowing films
Films set in Belgrade